Ratkovići may refer to:

 Ratkovići, Čelić, a village in Bosnia and Herzegovina
 Ratkovići, Kreševo, a village in Bosnia and Herzegovina
 Ratkovići (Goražde), a village in Bosnia and Herzegovina
 Ratkovići (Srebrenica), a village in Bosnia and Herzegovina

See also
 Ratković (singular)

Serbo-Croatian place names